The Take is a 1974 British-American action neo noir crime drama film directed by Robert Hartford-Davis and starring Billy Dee Williams, Eddie Albert, Frankie Avalon, Sorrell Booke, Tracy Reed, and Albert Salmi. It is based on the 1970 novel Sir, You Bastard by G. F. Newman. The film was released by Columbia Pictures in May 1974.

Plot
Lt. Terrence Sneed, a San Francisco policeman, is summoned to Paloma, New Mexico to help take down a local organized crime syndicate led by kingpin Victor Manso, a respected community leader. Soon after Sneed's arrival, he and Captain Frank Dolek stop a group of gangsters who ambush a courthouse and attempt to flee in a truck, but four officers are killed in the shootout. Later, Sneed visits his former lover, Dr. Nancy Edmondson, but she refuses to revive their relationship and accuses him of corruption. Sneed drives to the home office of Manso and accepts an envelope of cash to act as a middleman between law enforcement and the crime syndicate; Sneed learns that Capt. Dolek is also on the take.

Sometime later, Sneed hooks up with his money launderer Oscar, whom Sneed orders to follow Dolek. Sneed goes to the apartment of suspect Danny James, overpowers him and intimidates him into becoming an informant. Later, James informs reveals that a drug dealer named Zeno Elliot will be making a delivery to Manso. Sneed and Native American detective John Tallbear break into Elliot's apartment and find cocaine. Back at the station, Dolek tells Sneed that Elliot is to be released from police custody under orders of Manso, but Sneed blackmails Manso by revealing that he's had the captain followed. When Sneed returns to Manso's office he is beaten up for betraying Dolek, but Manso nevertheless calls Sneed valuable and gives him another cash payment. Manso's henchmen dump Sneed at Nancy's house, where she tends to his wounds.

Sneed and Tallbear raid Manso's mansion while he is attending a ceremony. They have to flee when Manso returns early after suffering a heart attack, but they obtain enough information to put a strike force into operation to intercept the vans Manso uses to transport illegal goods. Sneed leads a stakeout of Manso's front business, a paper company. However, Dolek has informed Manso of the plan. After two decoy vans mislead police, Sneed gives chase to a third van headed for the Mexican border; after it stalls in a river and Sneed fights the driver, Benedetto, he finds the van full of counterfeiting equipment. Benedetto bribes Sneed to minimize his charges, while Capt. Dolek double-crosses Sneed by informing Chief Berrigan about Sneed's corruption. After Sneed collects his take from Benedetto, he is confronted by Chief Berrigan and several officers in a set-up that Manso arranged. While Sneed pleads innocence back at the police station, claiming that the cash was his own (having switched the incriminating notes with Oscar), Benedetto is shot dead by Tallbear, eliminating Berrigan's only witness. Sneed's gun is returned to him and he goes to Manso's estate with several other officers, but Sneed refuses to admit guilt and Sneed gives in. Later, Tallbear informs Sneed that the price of Benedetto's murder is "fifty percent of everything." Sneed then reveals that he's been promoted to captain.

Cast
 Billy Dee Williams as Lt. Terrence Sneed
 Eddie Albert as Chief Berrigan
 Frankie Avalon as Danny James
 Sorrell Booke as Oscar
 Tracy Reed as Nancy Edmondson
 Albert Salmi as Capt. Frank Dolek
 Vic Morrow as Victor Manso
 A Martinez as John Tallbear
 James Luisi as Benedetto
 Kathrine Baumann as James' Girl (as Kathy Bauman)
 John Davis Chandler as Man with Braces (as John Chandler)
 Robert Miller Driscoll as Zeno Elliot
 Kathleen Hughes as School Nurse
 William Sargent as Barry Indus
 Vernon Weddle as Vanessi
 Dick Yarmy as Roclair
 Vic Perrin as Radio Announcer (uncredited)

Reception
Variety noted, "Tame police meller looks more like a vidseries pilot than a theatrical release. Okay of its omnipresent kind." Gene Siskel of the Chicago Tribune gave the film one-and-a-half stars out of four and wrote, "Is he a crooked cop, or he is just grabbing some extra dough while doing his job? If you can sit thru at least a dozen murders, assorted illegalities by both hoods and police, and the ubiquitous car chase, you will get an answer to the question. But believe me, it isn't worth the wait." Kevin Thomas of the Los Angeles Times called it "a lively, well-made action film, distinctive largely for its deeply cynical tone ... A film without anyone to root for or care much about is a risky proposition, but so much happens at such a fast clip that 'The Take' is actually quite diverting." Geoff Brown of The Monthly Film Bulletin declared that there is "no denying that at times The Take positively bristles with pace and professionalism: cars swerve about with tyres and sirens screaming, helicopters swoop, bullets sizzle and bodies fall—all captured with neatly feverish editing and a pounding soundtrack. And the film maintains its momentum in spite of its rather indecipherable story-line."

References

External links
 

1970s action films
1974 crime drama films
British crime action films
British crime drama films
American crime action films
American crime drama films
1974 films
Columbia Pictures films
Films based on British novels
Films scored by Fred Karlin
1970s English-language films
1970s American films
1970s British films